The Solway Aviation Museum is an independently-run aircraft museum located at Carlisle Lake District Airport in Cumbria.

It was closed during 2020 on account of the COVID-19 pandemic. In 2022 it is open every weekend from 1st April to 30th October, as specified in the Official Website listed below.

About the Museum
The Museum is run by The Solway Aviation Society Ltd and staffed by unpaid volunteers. The Society is a registered charity supported by entrance charges to the Museum, and public donations. In addition to normal opening (Fridays, Saturdays and Sundays plus Bank Holidays from April until October end) the Museum hosts educational visits for school classes studying the Second World War and for Scout, Cub and Beaver packs achieving their Air Activities Badge. Following the closure of the RAF Millom Museum, many of the artefacts were moved to Solway Aviation Museum for safe keeping and eventual exhibition when space permits. The Museum is now the sole aviation Museum left in Cumbria.

The Buildings contain exhibits and artefacts relating to aviation in Cumbria, including the Second World War and also houses individual displays featuring the development of the Blue Streak missile, Martin Baker ejection seats, and the development and activities of the Airport itself since the Second World War.

The Collection
The current collection includes the following:

See also
List of aerospace museums

References

External links

 

Museums in Cumbria
Aerospace museums in England
Buildings and structures in Carlisle, Cumbria
World War II museums in the United Kingdom
Irthington